The Optare Tempo is an integral low-floor, full-size rigid single-deck bus manufactured by Optare and was launched in late 2004. It is marketed and sold as the replacement for the Optare Excel. It is designed as a lightweight bus, to use less fuel than traditional heavy duty integral rigids. As of July 2017, 233 had been built, including 27 Tempo SRs. The Tempo SR has now been replaced in the UK market by longer variants of the Optare MetroCity, although production of the Tempo SR continues for the Australian market.

Tempo

The Optare Tempo was launched in October 2004 after the building of two pre-production prototypes (both of which saw use as demonstrators and still exist), one an example of the longest available (12.6 meters), the other an example of the shortest (10.6 meters), with the first production example (12.0 metres) delivered to Trentbarton in February 2005. It came in four different lengths: 10.6 (x1060), 11.3 (x1130), 12.0 (x1200) and 12.6 (x1260) metres and it has a raised roofline in the middle continuously to the rear roof spoiler instead of an arched top. Tempos were to be built in Optare's Cross Gates, Leeds factory  (since relocated).

Optare constructed the Tempo as an all welded heavy-duty box section integral from stainless and carbon steel dressed in a mix of GFRP (fibreglass) and aluminium modular exterior panels, integrating easy maintenance features like swing out headlamp clusters and multiple LED lamps. Key mechanical services are installed on a demountable frame, connected with "no-loss" couplings. Detailed analysis and computer modelling of the design and any impacts of stresses it would see in service were undertaken by finite element analysis firm Analysis by Firth, based in Wigan, UK. The resulting bus underwent testing at the Millbrook Proving Ground.

Achieving interior space comparable to buses 2.55 meters wide (at 2.5 meters wide), interior amenities offered included an optimised sound insulation package (Tempos were demonstrably up to 5dB(a) quieter at 40mph than contemporary rivals), uplighting, cantilevered seating, luggage pens, tinted single or double glazing, parcel racks, tables, climate control, power outlets and AV systems amongst others. Tempo cabs include a steering column with telescopic tilt and reach and later Optare's computerised 'eco drive' gauge pod with TFT. Designed and constructed by Actia (aiding Optare's electrical systems development since 1997), the revised dashboard incorporates telematics analysis with the ability to alert both the driver and operator in realtime (latter over the internet) to fuel consumption, maintenance issues and driving style.

It was originally powered by a Euro III Mercedes-Benz OM906LA engine (upgraded to Euro IV compliance with Adblue & Euro V compliance with SCR technology), with a Euro IV MAN D0836 EGR engine option later introduced (both 6 cylinder), coupled to an ZF ZF6HP500 Ecomat 2 six-speed automatic transmission as standard or optionally an Allison T310R five-speed automatic transmission. Its rear Rába drive axle was engineered to be smoother and quieter, with 4 air suspension bags at the rear and 2 at the front (with electronic kneeling capabilities). ZF 8098 steering gear is implemented through a MAN drop centre low-floor front axle.  In 2007, a hybrid version was introduced for London operators, utilising a "fully proven" and "fully reliable" Allison EP40 Parallel Hybrid drive system powered by removable NiMH batteries combined with a Cummins 250 hp ISBe Euro V SCR engine. This technology was integrated into ten 10.6 metre variants, which also featured TfL spec double doors, leaving space for 28 seats.

The Optare Tempo has stopped production and was replaced with the Optare Tempo SR.

Tempo SR

In October 2011, a restyled version was launched as the Tempo SR, borrowing from the Solo's naming convention. The Tempo SR came in three different lengths: 10.6, 11.3 and 12.0 metres and incorporated a Mercedes-Benz OM906L six-cylinder 210 kW (282 bhp) SCR engine, which continued to be housed on a removable cradle alongside the transmission (the MAN engine option being dropped). A notable reversal on the original design, ZF's 6HP500* six-speed transmission could be specified as an alternative to the now standard Allison T310R gearbox – both of which feature integral retarders.

Trentbarton, then having a long and close relationship with Optare, sparked the facelift of the Tempo to be "fundamentally different to anything else on the market". Between Trentbarton, transport design and branding agency Best Impressions (led by Ray Stenning) and Optare -featuring suggestions and ideas from Nottingham-area bus users- the Tempo SR was born.

The finalised bus was unveiled at Coach & Bus Live 2011, and marketed as "the new bus for Nottingham". Indeed, the vehicle exhibited wasn't a prototype or demonstrator but a to-spec, fully 'i4' liveried fleet member for Trent Barton. Stenning reflected that the design "has a natural flow and every line [had] a purpose" and it wasn't "tarting it up for the sake of it". The design reportedly drew on inspiration from Stenning's 'design heroes' Raymond Loewy and Pininfarina, with close attention paid to details. Trentbarton would take delivery of thirteen examples between May and July 2012.

Despite Trentbarton proclaiming their redesign was "taking the transport industry by storm", the vehicle proved divisive. For instance, although the same framework underneath, and constructed using the same methods, (even sharing concurrent chassis numbers with the original) operators contracted by the Welsh government continued to order the original Tempo even though the SR facelift had been out for over a year (albeit an order for a discontinued size, 12.60 meters). Following poor sales, the Tempo SR has now been replaced in the UK market by longer variants of the Optare MetroCity. However, Manchester Airport took delivery of a further four Tempo SRs in May 2017 for use on airport car park shuttle bus operations; these buses came from an order intended for an Australian operator, which was cancelled. As of October 2018, Trent Barton has replaced all Tempo SRs with Alexander Dennis Enviro200 MMCs, which is now operating the i4 service.

As of early 2019, municipal bus operator Ipswich Buses have purchased all 13 ex Trent Barton Optare Tempo SRs.

Operators

United Kingdom
Arriva UK Bus, First Cymru, RATP Group, Stagecoach Group, Transdev, Veolia Transport and Wellglade Group all have been purchasers of the original Tempo, not to mention several independent operators. It has been operated by Lynx, King's Lynn and Transport for London operators East London, London United and Metroline. Trentbarton and Manchester Airport have both purchased a number of Tempo SRs, though Ipswich Buses are now their biggest UK operator, having taken on Trent Barton's fleet.

Additionally, Lynx are now the largest operators of the Tempo in the world, having purchased large numbers of vehicles second-hand.

Europe

One left hand drive Optare Tempo was exported to Kiel, Germany in 2007, but it was taken out of service shortly afterwards.

Australia
In Australia, Tempos have been purchased by Carbridge and Park Ridge Transit.

References

External links
 

Low-floor buses
Full-size buses
Tempo
Vehicles introduced in 2004